The 2008 FIBA Europe Under-20 Championship for Women Division B was the fourth edition of the Division B of the Women's European basketball championship for national under-20 teams. It was held in Poznań, Poland, from 11 to 20 July 2008. Sweden women's national under-20 basketball team won the tournament.

Participating teams

  (16th place, 2007 FIBA Europe Under-20 Championship for Women Division A)

  (15th place, 2007 FIBA Europe Under-20 Championship for Women Division A)

First round
In the first round, the teams were drawn into two groups of five. The first four teams from each group advance to the quarterfinals, the last teams will play for the 9th place.

Group A

Group B

9th place playoff

Championship playoffs

Quarterfinals

5th–8th place playoffs

Semifinals

7th place match

5th place match

3rd place match

Final

Final standings

References

2008
2008–09 in European women's basketball
International youth basketball competitions hosted by Poland
FIBA U20
July 2008 sports events in Europe